BF3 may refer to:

Boron trifluoride, a chemical compound
Battlefield 3, a 2011 video game published by Electronic Arts
Star Wars Battlefront (2015) video game, the third game in the series
British Formula Three Championship

See also
 BF2 (disambiguation)